The Death of Art is a novel by Simon Bucher-Jones published in 1996 and based on the long-running British science fiction television series Doctor Who. It features the Seventh Doctor, Chris, Roz and Ace. It is part of the Psi Powers series of novels.

Synopsis

The Doctor and his assistants, Roz and Chris, travel to 1880s France, the corrupt world of the French Third Republic. A rip in time threatens Paris, a race struggles to free itself from oppression, and a strange brotherhood fights a battle for power.

References

1996 British novels
1996 science fiction novels
Virgin New Adventures
Novels by Simon Bucher-Jones
British science fiction novels
Seventh Doctor novels
Novels set in the 1880s
Novels set in 19th-century France